Liu Yuntao (born November 9, 1995) is a Chinese swimmer. He won a silver medal at the Men's 50 metre backstroke S4 event at the 2016 Summer Paralympics with 45.01.

References

Living people
Swimmers at the 2016 Summer Paralympics
Medalists at the 2016 Summer Paralympics
Paralympic silver medalists for China
Paralympic swimmers of China
Chinese male backstroke swimmers
S4-classified Paralympic swimmers
1995 births
Paralympic medalists in swimming
21st-century Chinese people